Braid snake or Jan's cliff racer (Platyceps rhodorachis) is a species of snake found in Central Asia.

Distribution
It is found in Algeria, Libya, Egypt, Israel, Jordan, Syria, Sudan?, Eritrea, Ethiopia, Somalia, Chad, Saudi Arabia, United Arab Emirates, Oman, Iraq, Iran (Kavir desert), Afghanistan, W Pakistan, Yemen, S Turkmenistan, S Uzbekistan, NW Tajikistan, W Kyrgyzstan, S Kazakhstan

Races:
subniger: Eritrea to Somalia.
ladacensis: Iran, east to Afghanistan, north to S Turkmenistan, S Uzbekistan, W Tajikistan., Pakistan 
kashmirensis: Pakistan (KHAN, pers. comm.); Type locality: from under pile of faggots near house of Master Muhammad Sadiq Goi Madan, Kotli, Azad Kashmir 33°30'N, 74°00'E. 1315 m

Type locality: Arabian Peninsula; Shiraz (Iran) [fide SCHÄTTI & McCARTHY 2004]

Highly variable in external morphology, particularly ventral scales.

References

 Boulenger, G.A. 1887 A list of the reptiles and batrachians obtained near Muscat, Arabia, and presented to the British Museum by Surgeon-Major A.S.G. Jayakar. Ann. Mag. Nat. Hist. (5) 20: 407-408
 Jan 1865 in: De Filippi, Viagg. Pers.: 356
 Perry, G. 1985 A new subspecies of Coluber rhodorachis (Ophidia: Colubridae) from Israel. Israel Journal of Zoology 33:123
 Utiger, Urs, Notker Helfenberger, Beat Schätti, Catherine Schmidt, Markus Ruf and Vincent Ziswiler 2002 Molecular systematics and phylogeny of Old World and New World ratsnakes, Elaphe Auct., and related genera (Reptilia, Squamata, Colubridae). Russ. J. Herpetol. 9 (2): 105–124.

External links

 http://www.podarcis.nl/downloads/2001/2/eng/OmanDeel422001Eng.pdf

Platyceps
Reptiles of Central Asia
Reptiles of Pakistan
Reptiles described in 1865

Snakes of Jordan
Reptiles of North Africa
Reptiles of Somalia
Reptiles of Ethiopia